Stephanie Louise Rice, OAM (born 17 June 1988) is an Australian former competitive swimmer. She won three gold medals at the 2008 Summer Olympics in Beijing, and was awarded the Medal of the Order of Australia on 26 January 2009.

On 9 April 2014, she confirmed her retirement.

Career
Rice was the gold medallist in the 200-metre individual medley at the 2006 Commonwealth Games in Melbourne, Australia, where she defeated Olympians Brooke Hanson and Lara Carroll in a time of 2:12.90, a personal best by 1.19 seconds. She also won the 400-metre individual medley.

At the 2007 Melbourne World Championships she won a bronze medal in the 200-metre individual medley in a time of 2 minutes 11.42 seconds, breaking the previous Australian record by a second. American Katie Hoff won the gold in 2:10.13, with Kirsty Coventry of Zimbabwe in second place. Rice once again placed third, earning her second bronze medal in the 400-metre individual medley final. In a new personal best time Rice finished in 4:41.19, taking 0.54 of a second off her previous best.

Rice set a new personal best time in the 400m individual medley at an Italian meet in June 2007. Rice went a 4:40.79, edging closer to the 4:40 barrier in the event. At the 2007 Japanese Open Championships, Rice beat her personal best time in the 400m. In placing second to Zimbabwean champion Kirsty Coventry, Rice set a new Australian and Commonwealth record of 4:37.18, a personal best by 3.61 sec.

At the 2008 Australian Olympic trials, Rice broke the world record in the 400-metre individual medley. Rice stopped the clock at 4 minutes 31.46 seconds, 1.43 seconds under American Katie Hoff's mark of 4:32.89. On 29 June 2008, at the U.S. Olympic Trials, Hoff regained the world record from Rice with a time of 4:31.12. Rice claimed her second world record of the meet, when she broke the 200-metre individual medley world record, clocking 2 minutes 8.92 seconds to slash almost a full second off the previous record held by China's Wu Yanyan.

At the Beijing Olympic Games, Rice received her first-ever Olympic medal, Australia's first gold medal of the games and its 400th summer Olympic medal, winning the 400-metre individual medley in a time of 4 minutes 29.45 seconds. In the process she reclaimed the world record from Hoff bettering the mark by 1.67 seconds, thus becoming the first woman to break the 4:30 in the event, (Kirsty Coventry also went under 4:30 in taking the silver).

2007 World Championships
Rice won bronze in the 200- and 400-metre individual medleys. In the 200-metre final, she recorded a time of 2:11.42, a second below the previous Australian record, behind American Katie Hoff in 2:10.13, and Kirsty Coventry of Zimbabwe, who claimed second place. In the 400-metre final, Rice recorded a new personal best time of 4:41.19, shaving 0.54 of a second off her previous best.

2007 Other events
Rice set a new personal best time of 4:40.79 in the 400-metre individual medley at an Italian meet in June 2007, edging closer to the 4:40 barrier in the event.

At the 2007 Japanese Open Championships, Rice won silver behind Zimbabwean champion Kirsty Coventry in the 400-metre individual medley. In doing so, she smashed her personal best time by 3.61 seconds, cracking the 4:40 barrier and setting a new Australian and Commonwealth record of 4:37.18.

2008 Australian Olympic Trials
At the 2008 Australian Olympic trials, Rice broke the world record in both the 400- and 200-metre individual medleys. In the 400-metre individual medley, she clocked 4:31.46, 1.43 seconds below American Katie Hoff's mark of 4:32.89. (Hoff retook the world record at the U.S. Olympic Trials on 29 June 2008, with a time of 4:31.12). In the 200-metre, she clocked 2:08.92 seconds, taking almost a second off the previous record held by China's Wu Yanyan.

2008 Summer Olympics
In Beijing, Rice won three gold medals (each in world record time) in the 200- and 400-metre individual medley events and in the 4×200-metre freestyle relay. In winning the 400-metre individual medley, Rice won her first Olympic medal, Australia's first gold medal of the games and their 400th Summer Olympic medal. Recording a time of 4:29.45, she reclaimed the world record from Hoff, bettering the mark by 1.67 seconds, and became the first woman to break the 4:30 mark in the event. (Kirsty Coventry also went under 4:30 in taking the silver.)

Her second gold medal of 2008 Games came on 13 August in the 200-metre individual medley with a new world record time of 2:08.45. Rice prevailed after being neck and neck with Coventry throughout the last 50 metres, who once again followed Rice to beat the old world record. On 14 August she won her third gold medal as part of the 4×200-metre freestyle relay team. She led off the team and Australia was in second place at the end of her leg.

2009 World Championships

Rice began the meet with a solid performance in the 200-metre individual medley. Despite losing her world record, she sliced 1.42 seconds off her personal best time while capturing a silver medal. Experimenting with the 200-metre freestyle did not end well as she failed to make the final. With the absence of Linda Mackenzie, Kylie Palmer and Meagan Nay, the team was never in medal contention, finishing 5th. Rice retained her 400-metre individual medley record however finished with a bronze in the final. She was awarded a silver medal for her contributions in the medley relay heats.

World Aquatics Championships 2011
Rice competed in the 200 m and 400 m individual medley. She failed to win a medal in 200 m medley finishing 4th in 2:09:65. In the 400 m medley she won a bronze medal with a time of 4:34:23, losing out on the silver by a deficit of 0.01 to Hannah Miley.

2012 Olympics 
Rice competed in London after undergoing three shoulder surgeries between the two Olympics. She finished fourth in 200 m individual medley and a joint sixth in 400 m medley. The London Olympics was her last stop as a swimmer and she eventually announced her retirement in April 2014.

Personal bests
Rice had a personal best of 2:07:03 in the 200 m individual medley achieved at the World Aquatic championships, Rome in 2009 and a personal best of 4:29:45 in the 400 m individual medley achieved during her gold winning effort at the Summer Olympics 2008.

Awards
 2008 - Telstra Australian Swimmer of the Year.
 2008 - Swimming World Magazine  Female World Swimmer of the Year as well as Pacific Rim Swimmer of the Year  
2009 - awarded the Medal of the Order of Australia  
2019 - International Swimming Hall of Fame inductee 
2019 - Sport Australia Hall of Fame inductee

Personal life

On June 17, 1988, Rice was born in Brisbane to Raelene Clark and Warren Rice.

Rice attended Clayfield College in her high school years in Brisbane, Queensland.

In September 2010, Rice came under fire when she made a homophobic comment on Twitter, relating to a Rugby Union match in which the Australian Wallabies defeated the South African Springboks. Rice's Twitter message said "Suck on that faggots!". Rice later removed the remark and apologised for it.  As a result of the incident Rice lost her sponsorship with Jaguar Cars, and was forced to return her Jaguar XF.

Rice has been vegan since 2012.

In 2013, Rice won season 3 of The Celebrity Apprentice Australia.

See also
 List of multiple Olympic gold medalists at a single Games
 List of Olympic medalists in swimming (women)
 List of World Aquatics Championships medalists in swimming (women)
 List of Commonwealth Games medallists in swimming (women)
 World record progression 200 metres individual medley
 World record progression 400 metres individual medley
 World record progression 4 × 200 metres freestyle relay

References

External links

 
 
 
 
 

1988 births
Living people
Sportswomen from Queensland
Australian female butterfly swimmers
Australian female medley swimmers
Australian female freestyle swimmers
Swimmers at the 2006 Commonwealth Games
Commonwealth Games gold medallists for Australia
World record setters in swimming
Olympic swimmers of Australia
Swimmers at the 2008 Summer Olympics
Swimmers at the 2012 Summer Olympics
Olympic gold medalists for Australia
Australian Swimmers of the Year
Recipients of the Medal of the Order of Australia
World Aquatics Championships medalists in swimming
Medalists at the 2008 Summer Olympics
The Apprentice Australia candidates
The Apprentice (franchise) winners
People educated at Clayfield College
Swimmers from Brisbane
Olympic gold medalists in swimming
Commonwealth Games medallists in swimming
Sport Australia Hall of Fame inductees
Medallists at the 2006 Commonwealth Games